Henry Bruckner (June 17, 1871 – April 14, 1942) was an American politician from New York who served three terms in the U.S. House of Representatives from 1913 to 1917.

Life
Born in New York City, he attended the common and high schools in New York and became engaged in the manufacture of mineral waters in 1892. He was a member of the New York State Assembly (New York Co., 35th D.) in 1901. He was commissioner of public works for the borough of the Bronx from 1902 to 1905.

Bruckner was elected as a Democrat to the Sixty-third, Sixty-fourth, and Sixty-fifth Congresses and held office from March 4, 1913, until December 31, 1917, when he resigned; while in the House he was chairman of the Committee on Railways and Canals (Sixty-fifth Congress). He resumed his former business pursuits in New York City and was also interested in banking; from 1918 to 1934 he was Bronx Borough president. He died in the Bronx in 1942.  He is interred at Woodlawn Cemetery in the Bronx.

One of the Bronx's main freeways, the Bruckner Expressway, is named in his honor.

See also
 Timeline of the Bronx, 20th c.

References

Sources

1871 births
1942 deaths
Bronx borough presidents
Burials at Woodlawn Cemetery (Bronx, New York)
Democratic Party members of the New York State Assembly
Democratic Party members of the United States House of Representatives from New York (state)